Kees Bregman (born 8 August 1947 in the Netherlands) is a Dutch retired footballer.

References

Dutch footballers
Living people
1947 births
Association football forwards
Association football defenders
Association football midfielders
ADO Den Haag players
MSV Duisburg players
Roda JC Kerkrade players
Arminia Bielefeld players
SC Fortuna Köln players
JOS Watergraafsmeer players